St. Luke's College of Nursing refers to either:
St. Luke's College of Nursing, Trinity University of Asia in the Philippines
St. Luke's College of Nursing (Japan), a college in Tokyo